Israel was present at the 1988 Eurovision Song Contest held in Dublin, Ireland. They were represented by Yardena Arazi with the song "Ben Adam".

Before Eurovision

Kdam Eurovision 1988 
For the 1988 edition of Israel's annual national selection, Yardena Arazi was internally selected by the Israeli Broadcasting Authority (IBA) to be the national representative. Previously, she had competed in the 1976 contest as a member of Chocolate, Menta, Mastik, who finished sixth with the song "Emor Shalom". She also co-hosted the 1979 contest alongside Daniel Pe'er in Jerusalem. She competed in the 1982, 1983, and 1985 national finals, finishing as runner-up in the first two and third in the latter, and co-hosted the 1987 edition alongside Yoram Arbel. For 1988, seeing as she had a high stature in Israeli popular music and still wished to compete, the IBA decided it was only fair to let her automatically take the slot as the country's representative, and use the national final to select her song.

The 1988 Kdam Eurovision was held on 27 March 1988 at the IBA Studios in Jerusalem and hosted by Rivka Michaeli. Arazi performed four songs, from which four national juries selected the one that would compete in Ireland. "Ben Adam," composed by Boris Dimitshtein and written by Ehud Manor (who also wrote the lyrics to several prior and future Israeli entries, including 1978 international champion "A-Ba-Ni-Bi"), was eventually chosen as the Israeli entry.

At Eurovision
As the story goes, when Arazi was initially approached to compete in Ireland, she consulted with her psychic, as she was very superstitious and wanted to be sure it was the right call. Her psychic informed her that the song drawn ninth would win the 1988 contest - which, as it happened, was the slot Israel was drawn to perform in (following the Netherlands and preceding Switzerland). She agreed to do it, only to be moved up to perform eighth following the withdrawal of Cyprus (who had been drawn to perform second). Switzerland, who were now performing ninth, did in fact win. However, Arazi was reportedly still in high spirits during her week in Dublin, and Israel left with a very satisfactory seventh place among twenty-one competing entries. Her backing performers included two members of Milk and Honey, who won the 1979 edition with "Hallelujah". The Israeli jury awarded their twelve points to Yugoslavia's Srebrna krila with the song "Mangup".

Voting

References

1988
Countries in the Eurovision Song Contest 1988
Eurovision